The Subic Special Economic and Freeport Zone, often shorterned as Subic Bay or Subic, is a special economic zone and freeport area covering portions of the city of Olongapo and the town of Subic in Zambales, and the towns of  Morong and Hermosa in Bataan. The relatively developed and fenced area is called the Subic Bay Freeport Zone (SBFZ).

The economic zone was the location of U.S. Naval Base Subic Bay, until the latter's decommissioning in 1992. The SBFZ is operated and managed by the Subic Bay Metropolitan Authority (SBMA), a sub-agency under the Bases Conversion and Development Authority (BCDA). The harbor faces the Zambales Mountains to the west and the Subic Bay opens to the South China Sea.

History

Subic Bay is surrounded by the town of Subic and the city of Olongapo, both in the province of Zambales, and Morong in the province of Bataan. Development of Olongapo was largely tied to the presence of the United States Navy base, once the largest U.S. military naval base in Asia. An arsenal and ship-repair facility was established at Subic Bay in 1885 by the then colonial power, Spain. Following the Spanish–American War, Subic Bay became a U.S. Navy and Marine base, and grew to be a major facility. Until 1991, it was the base of the United States 7th Fleet. In early 1991, after the collapse of protracted negotiations, the Philippine Senate rejected terms for renewal of the lease of the base. The U.S. Navy was already in the process of downsizing its Subic operations in June 1991, when Mount Pinatubo erupted. One of the largest volcanic eruptions in the last 100 years, it covered the Navy Base in volcanic ash and collapsed a significant number of structures. The last ship, USS Belleau Wood, left on November 24, 1992.  The presence of the American forces precipitated the start of a red-light district.

Post–Cold War
Subic Bay was converted into a commercial zone largely through the efforts of some 8,000 residents of nearby Olongapo, under the leadership of their mayor, Richard Gordon, who volunteered to protect and preserve 8 billion dollars worth of facilities and property from looting and destruction.  Subic has since been transformed and became a model for bases conversion into commercial use after the Cold War with blue chip companies like Coastal Petroleum, and Fed Ex pumping in over $3 billion of investments creating 70,000 jobs in the free port's first four years. It was host to the 4th APEC Leaders' Summit on November 24, 1996 and FedEx's Asia-Pacific hub, Asia-One, was also located in Subic Bay for almost ten years.

In 2013, Defense Secretary Voltaire Gazmin said that the Philippines intended to move military forces to the base in response to the territorial disputes in the South China Sea. The United States Navy is also seeking access on a rotational basis for ships and Marines, and is already conducting maritime patrol aircraft patrols from bases in the Philippines.

Geography
While the Subic Special Economic and Freeport Zone (as well as the agency responsible for the freeport zone's operations and management Subic Bay Metropolitan Authority (SBMA)) shares a name with a town nearby, it actually covers portions of Olongapo and the town of Subic in Zambales, and Morong and Hermosa in Bataan. This area is referred to as the Subic Bay Freeport Zone and out of this area  is suitable for development with the remaining portions consisting of high slopes, forests, or protected areas. In 2017, negotiations with local government units next to the Subic Bay Freeport Zone resulted in expansion of the fenced area.

The special economic zone is also adjacent to a body of water, the Subic Bay. There are also at least six mangrove areas in the Freeport Zone.

Districts
The Subic Freeport Zone itself is divided into districts. The freeport zone also has a Certificate of Ancestral Domain Title (CADT) Land, which is the ancestral domain of the Aeta people.

Binictican Heights
Central Business District (CBD)
Cubi-Triboa
Ilanin Forest East
Ilanin Forest West
Kalayaan Heights
Port District
Redondo Peninsula
Subic Bay Forest District (consisting of the non-adjacent areas of Tipo and Minanga areas)
Subic Gateway

Demographics
Most of Subic Freeport's population of at least 6,000 people is concentrated in the Kalayaan and Binictican areas. Portions of the Subic Freeport area also form part of a formally recognized ancestral domain of the Aetas, an indigenous ethnic group living in the area prior to its usage as a US military base. A significant Aeta settlement in Subic is Pastolan.

Economy

In mid-2019, there were about 135,000 workers employed in the Subic Bay Freeport, 68.37 percent of whom are engaged in the service industry and 17.03 percent in the manufacturing industry. Subic was also a hub in shipbuilding, with the now-defunct Hanjin Philippines previously being the single biggest employer in the area prior to its bankruptcy in January 2019. As of mid-2019, there are 5,901 workers employed in the shipbuilding and maritime industry by 96 firms compared to 26,559 workers by 110 companies in 2018. Subic is served by the Port of Subic.

Tourism

In addition to commercial use, Subic Bay is also a popular destination for weekend visitors from Metro Manila. Attractions include several beaches, an underwater aquarium, jungle survival tours, and duty-free shopping centers.

Destinations frequented by tourists in Subic include eco-tourism theme parks, the Ocean Adventure, Zoobic Safari, and the Pamulaklakin Nature Park which is home to the indigenous Aetas who once trained the U.S. Navy in jungle survival tactics.

Subic International Raceway (SIR), the Philippines' first purpose-built motorsports venue, was opened in 1994 and situated near Subic Bay International Airport. It was established by local racing champion, Pocholo Ramirez, and his family. SIR was host to international racing events, such as the Asian Festival of Speed, Asian Formula 2000 and the Asian Formula Three Championship. It also hosted local races, such as the Philippine Touring Car Championship, Run What You Brung (RWYB) and Circuit Showdown. The racetrack ceased operations in 2010 after the end of its lease.

The economic zone is also the host of the Subic Bay Yacht Club, and the bay has been favored as a location for sailing sports especially during the Habagat season.  Subic Bay also hosted the sailing events for the 2019 Southeast Asian Games.

Transportation
The Subic Special Economic and Freeport Zone is served by the Subic–Clark–Tarlac Expressway. Subic is also the site of Subic Bay International Airport which can be used for chartered flights. The airport was also a former Asian hub of multinational logistics company FedEx. The Port of Subic also serves direct passenger traffic through ferries going to and from Orion, Bataan. The freeport zone is also accessible via its gate in Morong.

Industrial parks 
Most of the businesses inside the Freeport Zone are composed of manufacturing, construction and warehousing. The operations of the freeport zone are subdivided into industrial parks, namely:

 Subic Bay Gateway Park (formerly Subic Bay Industrial Park)
 Subic Techno Park
 Global Industrial Park (SRF Compound)
 Boton Lights and Sciences Park

See also
Clark Freeport and Special Economic Zone
Freeport Area of Bataan

References

External links

Subic Bay (Freeport) Metropolitan Authority (SBMA) official website
The Official Tourism Website for the Subic Bay area, containing tourist and accommodation information (Authorized by SBMA)

Redeveloped ports and waterfronts in the Philippines
Redevelopment projects in the Philippines
Industrial parks in the Philippines
Buildings and structures in Olongapo
Buildings and structures in Zambales
Buildings and structures in Bataan
Free ports
Olongapo
Red-light districts in the Philippines
 
1992 establishments in the Philippines